Chikondi Banda (28 December 1979 – 8 August 2013) was a Malawian international footballer who played as a midfielder.

Career
Banda played club football for Big Bullets and Michiru Castles.

He made his international debut for Malawi in 2000, earning a total of 7 caps, including appearing in one FIFA World Cup qualifying match.

Illness and death
Banda died on 8 August 2013, due to cerebral malaria, aged 33.

Personal life
He is the father of the footballer Peter Banda.

References

1979 births
2013 deaths
Association football midfielders
Malawian footballers
Malawi international footballers
Nyasa Big Bullets FC players
Deaths from malaria
Michiru Castles FC players